Joculator myia is a species of minute sea snail, a marine gastropod mollusc in the family Cerithiopsidae.

The species was described by Jay and Drivas in 2002.

References

 Jay M. & Drivas J. (2002). The Cerithiopsidae (Gastropoda) of Reunion Island (Indian Ocean). Novapex 3(1): 1-45

Gastropods described in 2002
myia